The 1988 United States presidential election in West Virginia took place on November 8, 1988. All 50 states and the District of Columbia were part of the 1988 United States presidential election. West Virginia voters chose six electors to the Electoral College, which selected the president and vice president.

West Virginia was won by Massachusetts Governor Michael Dukakis who was running against incumbent United States Vice President George H. W. Bush of Texas. Dukakis ran with Texas Senator Lloyd Bentsen as Vice President, and Bush ran with Indiana Senator Dan Quayle.

West Virginia weighed in for this election as 13% more Democratic than the national average.  As of 2020 this is the last time a Republican presidential candidate won the presidency without winning West Virginia. The 1988 election cycle is also the last time that West Virginia did not vote for the same presidential candidate as neighboring Kentucky.

The presidential election of 1988 was a very partisan election for West Virginia, with over 99% of the electorate voting for either the Republican or Democratic parties, and only three candidates appearing on the ballot. Dukakis won the election in West Virginia with a 5-point margin. The relatively narrow election results in West Virginia are reflective of a nationwide reconsolidation of the base for the Republican Party, which took place through the 1980s. Through the passage of some very controversial economic programs, spearheaded by then President Ronald Reagan (called, collectively, "Reaganomics"), the mid-to-late 1980s saw a period of economic growth and stability. The hallmark of Reaganomics was, in part, the wide-scale deregulation of corporate interests, and tax cuts for the wealthy.

Dukakis ran his campaign on a socially liberal platform, and advocated for higher economic regulation and environmental protection. Bush, alternatively, ran on a campaign of continuing the social and economic policies of former President Reagan - which gained him much support with social conservatives and people living in rural areas. Additionally, while the economic programs passed under Reagan, and furthered under Bush, may have boosted the economy for a brief period, they are criticized by some analysts as "setting the stage" for economic troubles in the United States after 2007, such as the Great Recession.

Faithless elector
A rare event in any United States presidential election, West Virginia was home to a faithless elector in the election of 1988. During the assembly of the electoral college, one elector from West Virginia, Margarette Leach, cast her vote for Democratic vice presidential nominee Lloyd Bentsen as president, and Dukakis as the vice president. She did this in order to draw attention to the lack of accountability for electors under the Electoral College system.

Results

By county

See also
 Presidency of George H. W. Bush

Notes

References

West Virginia
1988
1988 West Virginia elections